Harmony Star Dust Grillo (born 1 January 1976) is an American social activist for women who worked in the sex industry and victims of sexual exploitation and trafficking.

Early life
Harmony was raised in Venice, California where she experienced a childhood filled with trauma and abuse. She and her younger brother were left by their mother at the age of 13 and 8 respectively. They spent the summer fending for themselves before she became involved with an older boy in her neighborhood. This young man essentially became her pimp when she entered the sex industry as an exotic dancer at the age of 19, using the stage name Monique.  She quit when she became a Christian in 1998.

Career
In 2000, Dust graduated magna cum laude from UCLA with a bachelor's degree in Psychology. While working towards a master's degree in Social Welfare, she founded Treasures Out of Darkness, an outreach program which distributed gift bags with support information to Los Angeles area strippers. She later changed the name to Treasures Ministries, a Christian outreach and support group for women working in the sex industry. After graduating, Dust worked for the Department of Children & Family Services (DCFS) and was a member of the National Association of Social Workers. In 2007, she received the Dorothy F. Kirby Outstanding Youth Social Worker Award from the California chapter of the National Association of Social Workers. She received both mayoral and Congressional recognition for her work in 2018. A flag was flown in her honor over the United States Capitol on May 19, 2018.

In 2010, Dust published her memoir Scars & Stilettos: The Transformation of an Exotic Dancer. The second edition was released in 2018. She was featured in Glamour magazine and seen on The Tyra Banks Show and Sex Rehab with Dr. Drew. In 2005 Treasures began training others to replicate the Treasures model of outreach and care. In 2011, Treasures Ministries partnered with Craig Gross of xxxchurch.com to create The Strip Church Network. They have since parted ways and Dust and her team continue to train other leaders around the globe as a part of the Treasures Network. As of 2018, they have trained outreaches in over 120 cities on 6 continents.

In May 2021 Dust gave a TED talk entitled "The Oldest Oppression in the Book" which addressed issues around prostitution and the movement to decriminalize it. The talk was given without an audience present because of the COVID-19 pandemic. In October of that year TED decided to no longer list the video on their website and Youtube channel citing that the video "falls outside the content guidelines TED gives TEDx organizers around political agendas." Dust herself claims that the unlisting is because the content of her talk does not match TED's political views. She re-published the talk on her own Youtube channel under the title "Should Prostitution Be Legal?"

Personal life
Dust married hip hop singer Pigeon John (formerly John Dunkin) in 2002. They divorced in 2010, and have one daughter together. She married Christopher Justin Grillo on March 14, 2015; they had a son in January 2018.

Published works
 Scars & Stilettos: The Transformation of an Exotic Dancer (2010)

References

External links
 Treasures Ministries
 Harmony Grillo official website
 "The Oldest Oppression in the Book" at TEDxUCLA

1976 births
Living people
American female erotic dancers
American erotic dancers
American social activists
Writers from Los Angeles
American Christians
University of California, Los Angeles alumni
American autobiographers
Women autobiographers
Activists from California
UCLA Luskin School of Public Affairs alumni
Anti–human trafficking activists
Anti-pornography activists
21st-century American women